Kulina is a village in the municipality of Derventa, Bosnia and Herzegovina.

Kulina is a village in the Derventa municipality.  Kulina is located along the road from Derventa to Modriča.  The primary school that was built before second world war and burned down during the WW II.  Before school was rebuilt students attended grade school in Žeravac.  Parish church was built in 1960's under leadership of parish priest Petar (Pero) Anić.  The modern structure modeled after Noah's Arc can be seen from great distances.  In 1992 the church, bell tower, Parish office and all houses in Kulina were destroyed and burned down by Serbian forces.  Church, bell tower, Parish office, residence and old school building were rebuilt with major support from Stipe Matic.

References

Villages in Republika Srpska
Populated places in Derventa